Dodge Township is one of seventeen townships in Dubuque County, Iowa, United States.  As of the 2000 census, its population was 1,204.

Geography
According to the United States Census Bureau, Dodge Township covers an area of 36.6 square miles (94.78 square kilometers); of this, 36.57 square miles (94.7 square kilometers, 99.92 percent) is land and 0.03 square miles (0.08 square kilometers, 0.08 percent) is water.

Cities, towns, villages
 Dyersville (partial)
 Farley (partial)
 Worthington

Adjacent townships
 New Wine Township (north)
 Iowa Township (northeast)
 Taylor Township (east)
 Whitewater Township (southeast)
 Cascade Township (south)
 South Fork Township, Delaware County (southwest)
 North Fork Township, Delaware County (west)

Cemeteries
The township contains these three cemeteries: Fairview, Saint Pauls and Worthington Baptist (historical).

Major highways
  U.S. Route 20
  Iowa Highway 136

School districts
 Western Dubuque Community School District

Political districts
 Iowa's 1st congressional district
 State House District 31
 State House District 32
 State Senate District 16

References
 United States Census Bureau 2007 TIGER/Line Shapefiles
 United States Board on Geographic Names (GNIS)
 United States National Atlas

External links
 US-Counties.com
 City-Data.com

Townships in Dubuque County, Iowa
Townships in Iowa